The 2009 Akron Zips football team represented the University of Akron in the 2009 NCAA Division I FBS football season.  Akron competed as a member of the Mid-American Conference (MAC) East Division.  The team was coached by J. D. Brookhart and played their homes game at InfoCision Stadium.

Before the season
Much of the anticipation leading up to the season involved the grand opening of the new on-campus Summa Field at InfoCision Stadium.  The university set up webcams, allowing fans to watch the progress of the stadium being built.  Fans watched online as the final stages of the stadium were pieced together, including a 40-foot by 25-foot video scoreboard and ribbon boards along the east stands.

The first Spring Training Scrimmage took place on March 12, after only five practices.  With the offensive side down two key running backs (DeVoe Torrence and Alex Allen), the defense was able to win this session, along with the second scrimmage on March 28.  In the annual Blue-Gold game, the defense came out victorious again, winning the game with a score of 28–24.  Key plays in this game included a blocked field goal by Norman Shuford and an interception by Kevin Davis.

Alex Allen was one of the 106 nominees for Allstate's AFCA Good Works Team.  According to the Press Release, this list "honors college football players who make outstanding contributions in the areas of volunteerism and civic involvement."

Recruiting

Schedule

Roster
The Zips lost relatively few starters from the 2008 football season.  However, the starters that they did lose include lettermen Dennis Kennedy and Chris Kemme, the latter of which signed for the Detroit Lions after the 2009 NFL Draft.  On the defensive side, Akron lost all three linebackers to graduation, and Strong Safety/Kickoff Returner Bryan Williams signed a free agency deal with the Cleveland Browns.

Coaching staff
The Zips made hired three new coaches for the 2009 football season.  Shane Montgomery was the head coach of the Miami Redhawks for the past four seasons, and moved over to serve as Akron's Offensive Coordinator and Tight Ends Coach.  During his time at Miami, he led the team to a first-place tie in the MAC East Division in both 2005 and 2007.  Walt Harris is best known for being the head coach of Pitt from 1997 to 2004 and Stanford in 2005 and 2006.  A week later, Akron announced the hiring of new Linebackers coach Vince Okruch.

Game summaries

Penn State

Ninth-ranked Penn State built a 31–0 halftime lead, holding Akron to 28 total yards and minus-17 yards rushing in the first half.  Akron was able to get on the board in the second half on a 40-yard touchdown pass from quarterback Chris Jacquemain following a Penn State turnover.  The Zips finished with 186 total yards, only 28 of which were from rushing.  Penn State amassed 515 total yards including 379 from passing, mostly from quarterback Daryll Clark, who also threw 3 touchdowns.  Following the win, the Nittany Lions rose to #5 in the polls and improved to 4–0 all-time against the Zips.

Morgan State

The Zips opened Summa Field at InfoCision Stadium against the Morgan State Bears, a Football Championship Subdivision team.  This was the Zips' first meeting with the Bears, as well as the Bears' season opener.  The Bears were led by Carlton Jackson, who had previously played for the Zips in the 2007 season.  He battled for the starting quarterback position with Chris Jacquemain in that year, who prevailed and led the Zips in this game.

Logistically, the game went on without any major problems and the new stadium was well received by fans.  The biggest problem according to fans was finding their appropriate parking lot.  During the game, Akron amassed 436 total offensive yards, which included 186 passing yards.  This was the most passing yards allowed by Morgan State since a 2008 game against Towson.  Despite the 250 yards rushing, no running back individually rushed for 100 yards, because six different backs were used.

Indiana

The game marked the second meeting between the two teams, the first being in the 2007 season at Indiana's Memorial Stadium where the Hoosiers won 41–24.  Indiana faced Akron in their third game of the season and first road game after defeating Eastern Kentucky and Western Michigan at home.  This was also the first time a team from the Big Ten Conference had played in Akron.  In the days leading up to the game, however, the Zips met with some adversity when it was announced September 18 that starting quarterback Chris Jacquemain would be indefinitely suspended for a violation of team rules.  No reason was given in that suspension nor was a timetable provided for his return.

Behind Ben Chappell's two touchdown passes and Ray Fisher's opening kickoff return, the Hoosiers were able to again defeat the Zips by a final score of 38–21.  For Akron, new starting quarterback Matt Rodgers, who had just two days of practice as the starting quarterback, completed six of his eight passes in the first half, but threw four interceptions in the second half.  Two of the interceptions would lead to touchdowns for Indiana.  The Zips were able to score touchdowns on a blocked punt early in the game as well as a Rodgers rushing touchdown.

Central Michigan

Akron began the MAC schedule with an away game against Central Michigan,  their first meeting since a 35–32 Central Michigan victory at the Rubber Bowl in 2007.  The Zips faced more discouraging news in the week leading up to the game.  First, it was announced on September 23 that Jacquemain had been dismissed from the team.  The next day, the university announced that sophomore Cowles Stewart had been suspended from the team after he was charged with felonious assault and Running Backs coach and Recruiting Coordinator Reno Ferri was put on paid administrative leave as the university began to investigate violations of NCAA Compliance rules.

Central Michigan Quarterback Dan LeFevour had a career day against the Zips, scoring six touchdowns in becoming the seventh MAC quarterback to pass for 10,000 yards in his career.  Matt Rogers achieved a pass efficiency of 120 with no interceptions.  He completed 12 of his 19 passes for a total of 127 yards.  Running Back Joe Tuzze also ran in for a score, which was the first in his collegiate career.  The Zips fell to 8–14 all-time against the Chippewas with the loss.

Ohio

After an off-week during the season, the Zips awaited their next MAC Opponent, Ohio University.  Overall, the series between these two schools are tied, 12–12–1, with the last game a 49–42 loss in Athens.  However, this series is heavily favored year after year towards the home team.  The last game that was lost at the Rubber Bowl was in 1997 when the Zips lost in a four-point decision.  Prior to the game, previously suspended running backs coach Reno Ferri had resigned from his position, effective November 1.  This resignation comes amidst an internal investigation by the university regarding recruiting violations.

The woes only got worse once the game started for Akron.  During the second quarter, starting quarterback Matt Rodgers suffered an ACL injury and was removed for the rest of the game, possibly the rest of the season.  To replace him, the Zips had to turn to their third quarterback, Patrick Nicely, who was originally planned to have a redshirt year.  The lone touchdown for the Zips came in the third quarter when running back Joe Tuzze ran for a 3-yard score.  Other than that, the game belonged to Ohio.  The Bobcats' scoring came from two field goals and two touchdowns (one two-point conversion attempt failed).

Buffalo

Akron began a three-game road series with a trip to UB Stadium to face the Buffalo Bulls.  Akron leads the overall series 8–2, but Buffalo has won each of the past two meetings, including a 40–43 quadruple-overtime decision in the 2008 season.  That was the last game in the historic Rubber Bowl, as the university was working hard on the new stadium.  The Zips, 1–4 on the season, had been in this same position in 2005, when they won the most conference games in the school's history as well as the MAC Championship.

Akron began the scoring in the second quarter when Mike Ward recovered a Patrick Nicely fumble in the endzone.  However, Buffalo quickly came back with 8:47 left in the first half and tied the game on a Maynard pass to make the game 7–7.  Buffalo scored again only four minutes later with another pass to Roosevelt, and the game went to halftime with the score 14–7.  After the break, Zips running back Alex Allen tied the game once again with a 1-yard touchdown run, and kicker Branko Rogovic gave Akron its final lead of 17–14 with 9:57 remaining in the game.  However, Buffalo was able to make the last score as Mario Henry made a 1-yard touchdown run with 6 minutes remaining in the game.  Akron was never able to recover.

This game was high in injuries as the Zips lost two significant players as a result of this game.  Leading receiver and senior Deryn Bowser left the game in the first half with a broken fibula.  Along with Bowser, Sophomore linebacker Aaron Williams suffered a broken arm in the 21–17 loss.  Both players will not return this season.  The Bulls also lost players due to injuries, with tailbacks Ike Nduka and Brandom Thermilus both going down with sprained ankle injuries.  Junior tight end Kyle Brey also left with a shoulder injury.

Syracuse

In the middle of the season, the Zips took a break from Mid-American Conference opponents and traveled to Syracuse, New York to take on the Syracuse Orange.  The series between these two teams only began last season, as Akron traveled to the Carrier Dome and came out with a victory, 42–28.  This victory was seen as an upset by many journalists, although the Orange finished the season 3–9 and finished last in the Big East Conference.  Syracuse was poised for revenge against Akron.

Freshman quarterback Nicely got the first touchdown of his collegiate career when he connected with Andre Jones in the first quarter.  After moving to the wide receiver position due to Bowser's injury, Andre Jones became the only player in the nation to start at four different positions, three on offense and one on defense.  Early in the second quarter, Syracuse got its first score from running back Delone Carter on a 7-yard run with 12:20 remaining in the half.  The Orange was able to score again with 4:14 remaining when Carter scored another touchdown.  With the score 14–7 in Syracuse's favor, Akron's kicker Branko Rogovic missed a 29-yard field goal to send the game into halftime.  The second-half kickoff was returned by Dashan Miller for 98 yards to tie the game, but Syracuse scored two more touchdowns, one by Marcus Sales and another by Carter, to win the game.

Northern Illinois

With hopes of playing in a bowl game all but lost, the Zips traveled to Northern Illinois University to take on the MAC West Huskies.  The Zips have faced the Huskies a total of nine times, including the 2005 MAC Championship Game on Ford Field.  Northern Illinois leads the overall series 5–4, although Akron has won the last two meetings.  The previous match up between these two teams was in the Championship Game.  Northern Illinois was ahead 30–24 with only 17 seconds remaining in the game when Luke Getsy connected with Domenik Hixon for a 36-yard touchdown pass to give the Zips a 31–30 victory.  Akron won both meetings in 2005 with a combined score of 79–62.

Along with the Zips, the Huskies have been having quarterback problems as well.  In an earlier game against the Toledo Rockets, starting quarterback Chandler Harnish was sent off of the field with a knee injury.  This forced the team to start their backup, DeMarcus Grady, for the Miami and Akron games.  In the first half of the game, the only scoring was provided by Northern Illinois kicker Mike Salerno when he scored field goals in the first and second quarter.  In the third quarter, however, the momentum shifted when Akron was able to make two scores to take the lead.  Branko Rogovic provided the first points by kicking a 34-yard field goal in their first possession after kickoff, and then scored a touchdown on an 80-yard pass from halfback Alex Allen to Andre Jones to make the score 10–6.

Northern Illinois would prove to bounce back in the fourth quarter however, and put three touchdowns on the board to win the game.  The first came only 1 minute and 25 seconds into the quarter, as running back Chad Spann rushed 28 yards for a touchdown.  Spann would score again with eight minutes remaining to put the Huskies ahead 20–10, and the game ended on a Nathan Palmer touchdown with only 46 seconds remaining.

Kent State

Every year, The University of Akron and Kent State University face off in a rivalry game for the Wagon Wheel.  While Akron has won 29 of the 51 matches against Kent State, the Golden Flashes held the lead since the Wheel was introduced in 1946.  This year's game is unique in the series, in which both teams' quarterbacks are pure freshmen who just came out of high school not even six months ago.  Kent State quarterback Spencer Keith took over the job as the original starter, Giorgio Morgan suffered an ankle injury in an earlier game.

Kent State was able to score on their first drive, moving 60 yards down the field to set up a field goal by Freddy Cortez.  However, Akron immediately responded with a drive on their own, but ended up scoring a touchdown to take the lead 7–3 in the first quarter.  The lead was extended in the second quarter by a 59-yard reception by Jeremy LaFrance, to set Akron's score at 14.  The Golden Flashes were able to come back at this point, scoring ten unanswered points which were finished by a field goal in the ending seconds of the first half.  In the third quarter, it had appeared that Jeremy Bruce had fumbled the ball, which was recovered by a Kent State defender and returned for a touchdown.  After the review however, it was determined that Bruce's elbow had hit the ground before the ball coming loose, therefore the player was down.  That play proved to be crucial to the Flashes, as they ended up losing the game by potentially one touchdown, with a final score of 28–20.

Temple

Bowling Green

Eastern Michigan

Statistics

Team

Scores by quarter

Offense

Rushing

Passing

Receiving

Defense

Special teams

References

Akron
Akron Zips football seasons
Akron Zips football